The Dutch Competition Act (Mededingingswet) was passed on 22 May 1997 and entered into force on 1 January 1998. It was most recently amended on 25 June 2014.

It is enforced by the Netherlands Authority for Consumers and Markets.

It is intended to conform to the relevant European policies and directives.

It prohibits abuse of a dominant position in the market by any Dutch company. Abuse is defined as one or more actions such as:
 imposing unfair prices or creating unfair trading conditions;
 limiting production or technical development;
 using different conditions for similar transactions with other parties.

Anti-competitive agreements are prohibited.  Any such agreements are declared null and void. Exemptions may be granted if they advance technical or economic progress. 

Administrative fines, penalty payments and binding instructions can be imposed by the Authority.

Mergers and takeovers must be notified to the Authority.

Text of the Act

References

Dutch legislation
Economy of the Netherlands